Mario Jelavić (born 20 August 1993) is a Croatian football forward, currently a free agent after playing for the Slovenian side Krka.

Club career
In 2014, Jelavic signed for Atlético Madrid C.

Jelavić made his debut for Hajduk, the club he spent four formative seasons with, on 31 July 2011 in a 1–0 defeat against NK Zadar. It was his only appearance for the 2011-12 season. For the second half of the 2012-13 season, Jelavić went out on loan to NK Slaven Belupo, making 8 appearances of which 3 were in the starting line-up, but didn't score a goal. For the 2014-15 season, Jelavić joined Atvidabergs FF. He scored 13 goals in 12 games for the club's youth side and 1 goal in 19 games for the first team, 1 of those appearances being from the starting line-up. For the 2015-16 season, Jelavić returned to Croatia, joining NK Solin. He was sent off on debut against Dinamo Zagreb II, but scored in his next game against NK Lučko.

Jelavić spent the 2021/22 season in the Cypriot Second Division playing for Akritas Chlorakas, scoring 11 goals in 26 matches. He moved subsequently to the Slovenian Second Division side NK Krka, leaving the club as a free agent in January 2023, having scored one goal in twelve matches.

References

External links

1993 births
Living people
Footballers from Split, Croatia
Association football forwards
Croatian footballers
Croatia youth international footballers
HNK Hajduk Split players
NK Slaven Belupo players
VfL Bochum players
Atlético Madrid C players
Åtvidabergs FF players
NK Solin players
NK Istra 1961 players
Royal Excel Mouscron players
NK Dugopolje players
NK Rudeš players
Akritas Chlorakas players
NK Krka players
Croatian Football League players
Tercera División players
Allsvenskan players
First Football League (Croatia) players
Belgian Pro League players
Cypriot Second Division players
Slovenian Second League players
Croatian expatriate footballers
Expatriate footballers in Germany
Croatian expatriate sportspeople in Germany
Expatriate footballers in Spain
Croatian expatriate sportspeople in Spain
Expatriate footballers in Sweden
Croatian expatriate sportspeople in Sweden
Expatriate footballers in Belgium
Croatian expatriate sportspeople in Belgium
Expatriate footballers in Cyprus
Croatian expatriate sportspeople in Cyprus
Expatriate footballers in Slovenia
Croatian expatriate sportspeople in Slovenia